David Padilla (1927–2016) was a Bolivian general and politician.

David Padilla may also refer to:

David Padilla (DJ) (1961–2020), American disc jockey
David Noel Ramírez Padilla (born 1950), Mexican author